Rorippa barbareifolia, the hoary yellowcress, is a plant species reported from Manchuria, Inner Mongolia, Mongolia, Siberia, Alaska, Yukon and Saskatchewan. It grows in wet habitats (though not completely submerged). It can be found along forest borders, in ditches, on stream banks, etc.

Rorippa barbareifolia can easily be distinguished from other species in the genus by its multi-valved fruits. Rorippa barbareifolia fruits have 3-6 valves, usually 4, while other species generally have 2, rarely 3. The plants are annual herbs with yellow, 4-parted flowers.

References

barbareifolia
Flora of Heilongjiang
Flora of Jilin
Flora of Inner Mongolia
Flora of Mongolia
Flora of Siberia
Flora of Alaska
Flora of Yukon
Flora of Saskatchewan
Flora without expected TNC conservation status